Aurobindo Ghosal  was an Indian politician. He was elected to the Lok Sabha, the lower house of the Parliament of India from Uluberia in West Bengal as a member of the Marxist Forward Bloc.

References

External links
Official biographical sketch in Parliament of India website

1914 births
Marxist Forward Bloc politicians
India MPs 1957–1962
Lok Sabha members from West Bengal
Year of death missing